Fnideq (Berber: ⴼⵏⵉⴷⵇ) is a town in northern Morocco, on the Mediterranean coast of M'diq-Fnideq Prefecture,  north of the city of Tétouan. The town is also known under the Spanish name Castillejos. It is the closest Moroccan urban commune to the Spanish exclave of Ceuta, although the rural commune of Belyounech is closer. During the Hispano-Moroccan War of 1859, it was the location of the decisive Battle of Castillejos.

Notable people
Hamza El Moussaoui, international footballer
Amin Erbati, former international footballer

References

Rif
Populated places in M'diq-Fnideq Prefecture